Jean Massez (born 15 April 1925) was a Belgian former speed skater. He competed in two events at the 1952 Winter Olympics.

References

External links
 

1925 births
Possibly living people
Belgian male speed skaters
Olympic speed skaters of Belgium
Speed skaters at the 1952 Winter Olympics
Place of birth missing (living people)